Jack Talbot-Ponsonby (10 March 1907 – 29 December 1969) was a British equestrian. He competed in two events at the 1936 Summer Olympics.

References

1907 births
1969 deaths
British male equestrians
Olympic equestrians of Great Britain
Equestrians at the 1936 Summer Olympics
People from Naas